Pranoprofen (INN) is a nonsteroidal anti-inflammatory drug (NSAID) used in ophthalmology.

References 

Nonsteroidal anti-inflammatory drugs